John Konihowski (born January 6, 1950) is a former Canadian Football League receiver who played nine seasons for the Edmonton Eskimos and Winnipeg Blue Bombers. He was a part of 4 Grey Cup championships with the Eskimos. Konihowski played college football at Brigham Young University and at the University of Saskatchewan, where he was also a track star. He is married to former Canadian pentathlete Diane Jones-Konihowski.

In track and field, he won two national titles at the Canadian Track and Field Championships: taking gold in the 400-meter hurdles in 1972 and the triple jump in 1970.

References
Saskatoon Sports Hall of Fame bio

Notes

1950 births
Living people
Sportspeople from Moose Jaw
Players of Canadian football from Saskatchewan
Canadian football wide receivers
Canadian male hurdlers
Canadian male triple jumpers
Edmonton Elks players
Winnipeg Blue Bombers players
Saskatchewan Huskies football players
Brigham Young University alumni
Canadian Track and Field Championships winners